YooMoney branded as ЮMoney, formerly known as Yandex.Money, is Russia's second largest electronic payment service after "Sberbank Online" according to a 2020 research by Mediascope. It is an online payment service that works with two types of clients — individual users and merchants.

The service was originally a joint venture of Russia's leading search engine Yandex (NASDAQ: YNDX), and Russia's largest bank Sberbank. Currently, Sberbank owns a 100% stake in the company. The program launched in 2002. With new stakeholders, Yandex.Money obtained access to a broad payment infrastructure of Sberbank including ATMs, terminals and online banking.

According to a June 2015 public opinion survey conducted by TNS, 92 percent of Russians are familiar with the service, and 44 percent regularly use Yandex.Money to make payments.

The company's headquarters are in Moscow, Russia. It has branch offices in Saint Petersburg and Nizhny Novgorod. Ivan Glazachev is Yandex.Money Chief Executive Officer. He became the head of the company on 1 March 2017.

Operations 
Yandex.Money has a b2b service Yandex.Checkout  — a payment aggregator for online stores and other businesses that need payments on their online platforms. Yandex.Checkout was launched by Yandex.Money in 2013. Yandex.Checkout is currently the leading service for accepting online payments in Russia, according to a 2016 survey by MARC.  With this payment system, merchants from all over the world can offer Russian consumers the online payment methods most popular among Russians and CIS-citizens just in one button ‘Pay with Yandex’: bank cards, direct debit (online banking), e-wallets, mobile phones, and cash via mobile retailers and payment kiosks (there are over 250 thousand cash-acceptance points all over CIS). 
 Currently more than 76,000 online stores across the globe use Yandex.Checkout, including such partners as Skype, AliExpress (Alibaba), JD.com and BlaBlaCar.

Yandex.Money also has an e-wallet, which is the original product of the company. Yandex.Money offers consumers easy, safe, and reliable methods of paying online on its own site  and mobile app. The service hosts about 30 million user accounts with about 15,000 new accounts opened daily. Recent TNS research  showed that Yandex.Money is the most popular e-wallet in Russia: every third user of the Internet in Russia pays by Yandex.Money e-wallet. Using Yandex.Money, gamers also can pay on Nintendo, top up an account on Steam, Wargaming, Riot Games, buy codes for Apple (iTunes) and Xbox. Yandex.Money became the official sales operator of the popular game publisher Electronic Arts. Russian users can now buy FIFA 17 for PC and Xbox through the service. Yandex.Money also distributes Blizzard Entertainment virtual cards, which provide users with a payment option for Blizzard's online games: World of Warcraft, Overwatch (video game), Heroes of the Storm, StarCraft, Hearthstone (video game), and Diablo (series) and be used for online casinos

Customers can also use Yandex.Money cards as a form of payment: both plastic and virtual MasterCards are available for issuing. In 2015 Yandex.Money received MasterCard Principal Member status. By the 2016 Yandex.Money has issued more than 500,000 plastic cards and 11 million virtual MasterCards. Yandex.Money was among the first to bring its users Apple Pay in Russia, which is transforming mobile payments with an easy, secure and private way to pay in stores, apps and on the web. Customers can pay via Apple Pay by adding their plastic or virtual prepaid Yandex.Money cards to Apple Wallet. Online stores and other merchants, which accept payments via Yandex.Checkout, can also offer consumers fast and convenient contactless payment via Apple Pay. With Touch ID there is no need to manually fill out lengthy payment forms or repeatedly type in billing information.

Mobile app 
Until June 2020, the YooMoney application was called Yandex.Money. Using the app, clients can transfer funds via iMessage, pay bills — such as utilities, internet, mobile services — make loan payments, access their most frequent payments, and more. Users can also download the app on Apple Watch. By 2016, the app have been downloaded by over 4 million users and 35% of them use an iOS device.

References

Yandex
Financial services companies established in 2002
Online financial services companies of Russia
Payment service providers